Awkward is an American teen comedy-drama series created by Lauren Iungerich which aired on MTV. The show's central character is teenager Jenna Hamilton (Ashley Rickards), who struggles with her identity, especially after an accident is misconstrued as a suicide attempt. The second season began on June 28, 2012, and finished on September 20, 2012. Season 3 premiered on April 16, 2013. Season 4 premiered on April 15, 2014. A Season 4 midseason finale premiered on June 17, 2014. The second half of Season 4 aired on September 23, 2014. On October 8, 2014, MTV announced the renewal of the series for a fifth season and final season. On social media, the producers and cast encouraged fans to tell MTV if they wanted the show to continue for season 6.

Series overview

Episodes

Season 1 (2011)

Season 2 (2012)

Season 3 (2013)
On July 16, 2012, Awkward. was renewed for an extended third season of 20 episodes. A promo was released March 11, 2013, which revealed that season three would begin on April 16, 2013 with a double bill. The season took a break after episode 10 aired on June 11 and returned on October 22. This season is the last to feature creator Lauren Iungerich as showrunner.

Season 4 (2014)
On August 5, 2013, Awkward was renewed for a fourth season. Chris Alberghini and Mike Chessler will replace Lauren Iungerich as showrunners. The season will consist of 20 episodes. Season four premiered with a special one-hour episode on April 15, 2014. The second half of the premiered on September 23, 2014. The season finale aired November 25, 2014.

Season 5 (2015–16)
On October 8, 2014, the show was renewed for a fifth season, which premiered on August 31, 2015. Although executive producers Chris Alberghini and Mike Chessler revealed, in November 2015, that they were hopeful that the show would be renewed for a sixth season, the series has not returned.  Season five had a mid-season break, from November 2015 to March 2016, returning March 15 with its final twelve weekly episodes.

Ratings

References

External links
 
 

Lists of American comedy-drama television series episodes
Lists of American sitcom episodes
Lists of American teen comedy television series episodes
Lists of American teen drama television series episodes